Ravi Amale is now working with Dainik Punya Nagari which is a second largest newspaper of Maharashtra, as an editor of Mumbai & Thane editions.

Ravi Amale was the Resident Editor of the Sakaal newspaper, the Marathi daily in Maharashtra.

Ravi Amale has authored a Marathi book on The [Research and Analysis Wing], R&AW or RAW which is the foreign intelligence agency of India namely, RAW - Bharatiya Guptacharsansthechi Gudhgatha and on Indian Reservation Policy (राखीव जागा - वस्तुस्थिती आणि विपर्यास) and translated Manhunt by Peter Bergen in Marathi language.

References

Indian newspaper editors
Year of birth missing (living people)
Living people